Fosna-Arbeideren was a Norwegian newspaper, published in Kristiansund in Møre og Romsdal county.

Fosna-Arbeideren was started on 21 December 1926 as the Communist Party organ in the Nordmøre region. It was published weekly, except for a period in 1928 when it was published twice a week. The newspaper ceased after its last issue on 25 May 1929.

References

1926 establishments in Norway
1929 disestablishments in Norway
Companies based in Kristiansund
Communist Party of Norway newspapers
Defunct newspapers published in Norway
Mass media in Møre og Romsdal
Norwegian-language newspapers
Publications established in 1926
Publications disestablished in 1929